Abietane is a diterpene that forms the structural basis for a variety of natural chemical compounds such as abietic acid, carnosic acid, and ferruginol which are collectively known as abietanes or abietane diterpenes.

Abietanes are found in the tissues and resins of certain higher plants, particularly gymnosperms. Although the functions of terpenes are not fully understood, conifers appear to produce abietane diterpenoids as a form of defense against insect and microbial attack. Some abietane diterpenoids, especially aromatic abietenes, are of interest to the pharmacology and natural products communities for their potential biological activities. In the rock record, abietanes are commonly found in amber as well as in fossil wood, sometimes in the form of the mineral fichtelite. Additionally, abietanes are observed in sediments—both riverine and marine—and in coals, where they are often interpreted as geochemical biomarkers for terrestrial input from conifers.

Chemical structure and properties 

Abietanes are tricyclic 20-carbon diterpenoids characterized by three fused six-membered rings and alkyl functional groups at carbons 4, 10, and 13. In higher plants, abietanes and other diterpenoids are synthesized from four five-carbon isoprene units. Abietanes are generally nonpolar, volatile, and less dense than water. The presence of one or more polar functional groups (typically a carboxylic acid or alcohol) tends to increase the polarity and boiling point of a given abietane relative to its unsubstituted hydrocarbon form.

Biological sources and synthesis 

In higher plants, abietanes are synthesized from geranylgeranyl diphosphate (GGPP) via a copalyl diphosphate (CPP) intermediate. First, GGPP is cyclized by a class II diterpene cyclase enzyme to CPP. The conformation of the GGPP molecule dictates the stereochemistry of the CPP intermediate after cyclization. The stereochemistry of the typical abietane skeleton suggests a GGPP precursor with its fused cyclohexyl rings in a chair-chair ("normal") conformation, although some abietanes with alternative stereochemistry may be cyclized from CCP isomers containing alternative combinations of boat and chair cyclohexane conformers. After the initial cyclization to CPP, which forms rings A and B in the abietane skeleton, the C ring is formed with the help of a class I diterpene synthase enzyme. Subsequent methyl migration and dehydrogenation steps yield the abietene isomers.

Preservation and diagenesis 

Diagenetic transformation of biomolecules is not fully understood, but several broad diagenetic patterns are hypothesized to affect the transformation of abietanes as they are heated and pressurized in sediments. The first of these patterns is defunctionalization. In particular, the reducing conditions of diagenesis are believed to cause abietanes to lose oxygen-containing functional groups, including carboxylic acids and alcohols, as well as methyl groups. In addition to defunctionalization, abietanes likely undergo dehydrogenation and aromatization reactions to form more energetically stable systems of conjugated pi bonds in their characteristic three ring structure. The hypothesized diagenetic pathway of abietic acid is illustrative of these general patterns. Abietic acid is dehydrogenated to dehydroabietic acid, which then loses its carboxylic acid functional group to become dehydroabietin. Loss of the 5-Me group and further dehydrogenation form the aromatic 1,2,3,4-tetrahydroretene molecule. Final aromatization produces retene, a common biomarker molecule observed in sedimentary samples.

Measurement Techniques 
Abietanes found in modern gymnosperm resins as well as in the rock record are separated and characterized by gas chromatography-mass spectrometry (GC-MS). Because polar functional groups reduce molecular volatility and make separation by gas chromatography difficult, abietane derivatives containing carboxylic acid and alcohol moieties are often derivatized with trimethylsilyl groups by treatment with BSTFA prior to GC-MS analysis. More oxidized abietane derivatives have been studied using thermally assisted methylation using tetramethylammonium hydroxide (TMAH) followed by GC-MS analysis. MS-MS analysis has been used to elucidate fragmentation mechanisms for mass spectrum peaks of interest. Mass spectra for abietic acid and some other common abietanes are publicly available in the NIST database. The spectrum for abietic acid possesses characteristic peaks at m/z = 256 and 241.

Use as a biomarker 
Abietanes preserved in geological settings are typically interpreted to derive from gymnosperms, specifically conifers. Although both modern angiosperms and modern gymnosperms synthesize terpenoids, gymnosperm tissues tend to contain significantly higher terpenoid concentrations than angiosperm tissues. Additionally, the relative abundances of di-, tri-, and penta-cyclic terpenoids varies between gymnosperms and angiosperms. Although some angiosperm families (notably Burseraceae, Euphorbiaceae and Ranunculaceae) are also known to produce abietanes, in general, tricyclic diterpenoids, including abietanes, are much more abundant in gymnosperms. For these reasons, and because conifers produce significant biomass relative to other gymnosperms, abietanes preserved in geological settings are typically interpreted as conifer biomarkers. It is important to note, however, that such interpretations rely on the assumption that terpenoid distributions and abundances in ancient plants were similar to those in modern plants. Loss of more volatile mono- and sesquiterpenoids during diagenetic heating may help explain the different relative abundance of diterpenoids, including abietanes, in ancient resins and the rock record compared to modern conifer samples.

Examples from archaeology 

 Abietenes from colophony, tar, and pitch have been identified in caulking used on ancient ships.
 Abietanes have been used to identify conifer resins associated with Egyptian mummies.
 The ratio of oxidation products of abietanes including dehydroabietic acid and de-7-oxo-dehydroabietic acid and 15-hydroxyl-7-oxo-dehydroabietic acid have been used to estimate the oxidation state of varnish on Vermeer's famous painting, "Girl with a Pearl Earring."

Examples from geochemistry 

 Carbon isotopic measurements of abietanes and other di- and tri-terpenoids have been made in modern plants, as well as in ancient samples, where they reveal a carbon isotope excursion during the Paleocene-Eocene Thermal Maximum (PETM).
Abietanes found in marine sediments have been used as evidence of ancient terrigenous input.
Abietane diterpenoids have been attributed to resinous vascular plants in samples dating to the Jurassic.

See also 

 Phyllocladane
 Ferruginol
Labdane
Pimaric acid
Simonellite
18-Norabietane

References

Diterpenes
Hydrocarbons
Phenanthrenes
Tricyclic compounds